André Dulait (14 November 1937 – 18 January 2020) was a French politician and a member of the Senate of France. He represented the Deux-Sèvres department and was a member of the Union for a Popular Movement Party.

References
Page on the Senate website

1937 births
2020 deaths
French Senators of the Fifth Republic
Union for a Popular Movement politicians
Senators of Deux-Sèvres